Will You Speak This Word is the fourth studio album by English post-punk band Dome, released in 1982 by Norwegian record label Uniton.

Content 

According to Trouser Press, Will You Speak This Word "combines some of Dome 3s ethnic borrowings with the repetitive minimalism of earlier works."

 Reception 

AllMusic called it "even more intriguing" than Dome 3, "if in some ways impenetrable". Trouser Press called it "a progressive album in the truest sense of the term".

 Track listing 
All songs written by Bruce Gilbert and Graham Lewis unless otherwise indicated.

 Personnel 
Credits adapted from liner notes.Engineering Eric RadcliffeDome Bruce Gilbert - vocals, production
 Graham Lewis - vocals, productionAdditional Musicians'
 Vincent Clark - vocals, Fairlight Computer Synthesizer (track 1)
 Deborah Danahey - vocals (track 1)
 David Drinkwater - violin (track 1)
 Terrence Leach - saxophone (tracks 1, 3, 4, 6)

References

External links 

 

1982 albums
Dome (band) albums